Aldridge is an unincorporated community in Walker County, in the U.S. state of Alabama.

The community has the name of the local Aldridge family. A variant name was "Stith".

Demographics
According to the returns from 1850-2010 for Alabama, it has never reported a population figure separately on the U.S. Census.

Notable person
 Loel Passe, baseball broadcaster for the Houston Astros (1962–76)

References

Unincorporated communities in Walker County, Alabama
Unincorporated communities in Alabama